M R D Dattan (7 July 1935 – 1 August 2006) was a famous artist and sculptor in the state of Kerala, India. Dattan's works include statues of Mahatma Gandhi, Swami Vivekananda and Sree Narayana Guru. He had created more than 200 statues of Sree Narayana Guru alone.

He was the son of Raman (who was the Palace painter of Kochi royal family) and Kavootti. After his studies at Madras School of Art, he returned to Kerala to become the director of Cochin School of Art that his father established.

His other works include statues of C. Kesavan, Vallathol Narayanamenon, Dr. Ambedkar, Panambilli Govindamenon, R. Venkata Raman and "Guruvayur Kesavan". He was also the recipient of the Lalith Kala Akademi fellowship.

References

Artists from Kochi
1935 births
2006 deaths
Indian male sculptors
Government College of Fine Arts, Chennai alumni
20th-century Indian sculptors
20th-century Indian male artists